Christian Zermatten (born 21 June 1966) is a Swiss professional football manager. Zermatten coached professional teams in Switzerland, Malaysia, Algeria, Morocco, Tunisia, and Ivory Coast, but is best known for his stints managing FC Sion.

References

External links
FDB Profile
 Christian Zermatten Interview (1)
 Christian Zermatten Interview (2)
 Christian Zermatten Interview (3)

1966 births
Living people
People from Sion, Switzerland
Swiss football managers
USM Annaba managers
AS Gabès managers
FC Stade Nyonnais managers
FC Fribourg managers
FC Chiasso managers
FC Sion managers
Stade Malien managers
Perak F.C. managers
Swiss expatriates in Malaysia
Swiss expatriate sportspeople in Mali
Swiss expatriate sportspeople in Ivory Coast
Swiss expatriate sportspeople in Algeria
Swiss expatriate sportspeople in Morocco
Swiss expatriate sportspeople in Tunisia
Sportspeople from Valais